Silver Bell may refer to:

Halesia, a deciduous tree
Lanark Silver Bell, a horse racing trophy
Silver Bell (album), an album by Patty Griffin
Silver Bell Mountains, a mountain range in Pima County, Arizona
Silver Bell, Arizona, a populated place in Pima County, Arizona
Silverbell artifacts, artifacts found near Tucson, Arizona
Silverbell Lake, a lake near Tucson
Silver Bell Estates, Alberta

See also
Silver Bells